Steve Weisberg (born 1963 in Norfolk, Virginia, United States) is an American composer, pianist, recording artist, and producer. In the 1980s, after studying with Michael Gibbs at Berklee College in Boston, Massachusetts, he recorded the XtraWatt/ECM release "I Can't Stand Another Night Alone (In Bed With You)," produced by Carla Bley and Steve Swallow, recorded and performed with Karen Mantler and her Cat Arnold, and contributed arrangements for Hal Willner's Lost in the Stars: The Music of Kurt Weill (A&M). He was also a member of infamous Boston band Sons of Sappho. In addition, he has contributed music to the films Atlas Shrugged - Part 1, Things to Do in Denver When You're Dead, Don't Say a Word, Impostor, Runaway Jury, Bewitched, the 2006 documentary The Ground Truth, Step Brothers, The Express: The Ernie Davis Story, and the documentary Banner On The Moon.

Through the end of the 1980s and into the 1990s, he performed in and around New York City with Steve Weisberg & His Orchestra, a 13-piece ensemble consisting of many of New York's noteworthy jazz luminaries and trend-setters.

He spent the 1990s performing with Flamin' Amy Coleman and acting as musical director for off-off-Broadway musicals, including a 1995 run at La MaMa in New York City's East Village with the critically acclaimed original musical, "The House of Nancy Dunn" (co-written with Andrew Craft, JJ Hickey, and Howard Pflanzer).

Weisberg re-emerged in 2002 to arrange for Hal Willner's Stormy Weather: The Music of Harold Arlen (Sony). He moved to Los Angeles in 2003, and in 2004 continued to act as musical director/arranger for two Hal Willner events: "Shock & Awe: The Music of Randy Newman," featuring Los Lobos, Howard Tate, Gavin Friday, Victoria Williams, Vic Chesnutt, Stan Ridgway, and Van Dyke Parks, and "Let's Eat: A Tribute to The Firesign Theater," featuring John Goodman, George Wendt, Howard Hesseman, Todd Rundgren, Loudon Wainwright III, Chloe Webb, and David Thomas (Pere Ubu).

In 2006, he produced the critically acclaimed studio release Portrait of Howard by 60's soul legend Howard Tate, which features Lou Reed, Carla Bley, Larry Goldings, Pete Thomas and Davey Faragher of Elvis Costello fame, along with a 20-piece orchestra.

In 2007, he acted as musical director and arranger for Perla Batalla's "The Gospel According to Leonard Cohen," an all-star tribute concert in Los Angeles including Jackson Browne, Michael McDonald, Howard Tate, Bill Frisell, and Jill Sobule.

In 2010, he was musical director for the 30th Anniversary Celebration of the Solidarity Movement founded by Lech Walesa in Gdansk, Poland with artistic director Robert Wilson and music producer Hal Willner, and featuring Macy Gray, Marianne Faithfull, Rufus Wainwright, and Angelique Kidjo. In addition, he produced tracks for 'operapper' Reggie Bennett (a classically trained baritone singer and rapper) creating a new genre combining hip-hop and operatic style singing.
His string arrangements can be heard on the song "Even Now Part One" by Diego Clare.

In 2011 he was also co-musical director for "Hal Willner's Shelabration -- Celebrating the Work of Shel Silverstein" at the Central Park Summerstage series in New York City featuring Lou Reed, Laurie Anderson, Emily Haines, Sally Timms of The Mekons, Bobby Bare Jr., Suzanne Vega, Steven Bernstein, Roswell Rudd, Terry Adams, Richard Belzer, Darryl Hammond, Dan Zanes, Reggie Bennett, Pat Dailey, Annabella Sciorra, The Handsome Family, Martha Wainwright, Melvin Van Peebles, Shilpa Ray, Gary Lucas, Duke McVinnie, and Chloe Webb.

2012 marked the return of live performance by Steve Weisberg and his 18 piece Orchestra in and around the Los Angeles area and a residency at the Center for the Art of Performance (CAP) at UCLA.

In 2013, Anti Records released Hal Willner's Son of Rogue's Gallery, a compilation of sea chanteys with multiple arrangements by Weisberg for artists including Beth Orton, Johnny Depp, Shane MacGowan, Macy Gray, Tim Robbins, and Anjelica Huston.

References

External links
 
 
 Steve Weisberg Discography at ECM

1963 births
20th-century American male musicians
20th-century American pianists
21st-century American male musicians
21st-century American pianists
American film score composers
American male film score composers
American male pianists
Living people
Musicians from Norfolk, Virginia